Ernest Richard Glenister Sheil (2 May 1906 – 26 December 1970) was an Australian rules footballer who played with Carlton and Hawthorn in the Victorian Football League (VFL).

Notes

External links 

Ernie Sheil's profile at Blueseum

1906 births
1970 deaths
Carlton Football Club players
Hawthorn Football Club players
University Blues Football Club players
Australian rules footballers from Melbourne
People from Carlton, Victoria